The 2015–16 Syracuse Orange men's basketball team represented Syracuse University during the 2015–16 NCAA Division I men's basketball season. The Orange were led by 40th-year head coach Jim Boeheim and played its home games at the Carrier Dome in Syracuse, New York. They were third year members of the Atlantic Coast Conference (ACC). The Orange finished the season 23–14, 9–9 in ACC play to finish in a tie for 9th place. They lost to Pittsburgh in the second round of the ACC tournament. They received an at-large bid to the NCAA tournament as a #10 seed where they defeated Dayton, Middle Tennessee, Gonzaga, and Virginia to reach the Final Four for the sixth time in school history. At the Final Four, the Orange lost to North Carolina.

Previous season
The Orange finished the 2014–15 season with a record of 18–13, 9–9 to finish in 8th place in ACC play. Syracuse did not participate in the postseason due to a self-imposed postseason ban as a response to an ongoing NCAA investigation into potential past infractions by the team. Syracuse University initiated the case, which includes academics, when it self-reported potential athletic department violations to the NCAA in 2007. School officials said that none of the conduct occurred after 2012, and no current student-athlete is involved. The ban included the NCAA tournament, ACC tournament and NIT.

Departures

Recruits

Roster

Schedule

|-
!colspan=12 style="background:#; color:white;"| Exhibition

|-
!colspan=12 style="background:#; color:white;"| Non-conference regular season

|-
!colspan=12 style="background:#; color:white;"| ACC regular season

|-
!colspan=12 style="background:#; color:white;"| ACC Tournament

|-
!colspan=12 style="background:#; color:white;"| NCAA tournament

Rankings

2016–17 Recruiting

References

Syracuse Orange men's basketball seasons
Syracuse
Syracuse Orange men's b
Syracuse Orange men's b
Syracuse
NCAA Division I men's basketball tournament Final Four seasons